We Are the Ark was released on 25 September 2000 and is the debut studio album from Swedish glam rock group The Ark. The album was both a critical and commercial success, spawning four singles.

Track listing
All songs were written by Ola Salo.
"Hey Modern Days" – 3:50
"Echo Chamber" – 3:39
"Joy Surrender" – 3:55
"It Takes a Fool to Remain Sane" – 4:10
"Ain't Too Proud to Bow" – 3:31
"Bottleneck Barbiturate" – 4:57
"Let Your Body Decide" – 3:13
"Patchouli" – 2:33
"This Sad Bouquet" – 5:02
"Angelheads" – 3:21
"Laurel Wreath" – 3:44
"You, Who Stole My Solitude" – 5:01

Personnel
Ola Salo – lead vocals, piano, keyboards, percussion
Martin Axén – rhythm guitar, backing vocals
Mikael Jepson – lead guitar
Leari Ljunberg – bass, backing vocals
Sylvester Schlegel – drums, backing vocals

Singles
"Let Your Body Decide" (twice)
"It Takes a Fool to Remain Sane"
"Joy Surrender"
"Echo Chamber"

Charts

References

2000 debut albums
The Ark (Swedish band) albums